Nevena Damjanović (Serbian Cyrillic: Невена Дамјановић; born 12 April 1993) is a Serbian football defender who plays for CSKA Moscow and the Serbia national team. She moved to Danish club Fortuna Hjørring in 2015, after spending five seasons with Serbian Prva Ženska Liga club ŽFK Spartak Subotica.

International goals

References

External links
 
 

1993 births
Living people
Serbian women's footballers
Serbian expatriate footballers
Serbian expatriate sportspeople in Denmark
Serbia women's international footballers
Expatriate women's footballers in Denmark
Expatriate women's footballers in Portugal
ŽFK Spartak Subotica players
Fortuna Hjørring players
Women's association football defenders
Campeonato Nacional de Futebol Feminino players
Sporting CP (women's football) players
Sportspeople from Kragujevac